This article gives a list of current and former municipalities of the Dutch province of Limburg. Limburg has 33 municipalities.

Current municipalities

Former municipalities 

 
Geography of Limburg (Netherlands)